The 2008–09 Indonesia Super League was the first edition of the Indonesia Super League, which replaced the Premier Division as the top-tier football competition in the country. The league was sponsored by Djarum and was officially called Djarum Super Liga Indonesia (SLI) or Djarum Indonesia Super League (ISL).

Persipura Jayapura clinched the title after winning a match 3–1 against Persija Jakarta on 17 May 2009. This was their first Indonesia Super League title and second title, counting the Premier Division era.

Teams
The teams in 2008–09 Indonesia Super League season:

Personnel and sponsoring

Foreign players

Managerial changes

League table

Standing

Positions by round

Results

Promotion/relegation play-off 
Persebaya Surabaya 1–1 PSMS Medan (6–5 pens)
(Jairon Feliciano Damasio 88pen; Leonardo Martins Dinelli 32pen)

Penalties:
   Persebaya:   Anang Ma'ruf
                Jairon Feliciano Damasio
                Purwanto
                Bobby Satria
                Anderson da Silva
                Andi Oddang

   PSMS    :   Andika Yudhistira Lubis 
               Muhammad Afan Lubis
               Esteban Guillen
               Mario Alejandro Costas
               Aun Carbiny

Persebaya Surabaya promoted to the top flight

Source:RSSSF
</onlyinclude>

Season statistics

Top goalscorers
This is a list of top scorers of the 2008–09 season.

14 goals

 Saktiawan Sinaga (Persik Kediri)

13 goals

 James Debbah (PKT Bontang)
 Rahmat Rivai (Persitara Jakarta Utara)

12 goals

 Zada (PSMS Medan)

11 goals

 Keith Gumbs (Sriwijaya)
 Pieter Rumaropen (Persiwa Wamena)

10 goals

 Boakay Eddie Foday (Persiwa Wamena)
 Gaston Castano (PSIS Semarang/Persiba Balikpapan)

9 goals

 Josiah Seton (PKT Bontang)
 Zah Rahan (Sriwijaya)
 Redouane Barkaoui (Persiwa Wamena)
 Dicky Firasat (Persela Lamongan)

8 goals

 Aldo Baretto (PSM Makassar)
 Claudio Pronetto(PSM Makassar)
 Evaldo (Persijap Jepara)
 Lorenzo Cabanas (Persib Bandung)
 Edesio (Deltras)
 Aliyudin (Persija Jakarta)

7 goals

 Michel Adolfo de Souza (Persita Tangerang)

6 goals

 Anoure Obiora (Sriwijaya)
 I Made Wirahadi (Persita Tangerang)
 Rahmat Affandi (PSMS Medan)

5 goals

 Imral Usman (PKT Bontang)
 Pablo Frances (Persijap Jepara)
 Souleymane Traore (Arema Malang)
 Emalue Serge (Arema Malang)
 Fandy Mochtar (Arema Malang)
 Ronald Fagundez (Persik Kediri)
 Firdaus Nyong Aman (Deltras Sidoarjo)
 Carlos Raul Sciucatti (Persela Lamongan)

4 goals

 Danilo Fernando (Persik Kediri/Deltras))
 Eduard Ivakdalam (Persipura Jayapura)
 Benoît Lumineau (Persiwa Wamena)
 Tariq Chaoui (Persiwa Wamena)
 Émile Mbamba (Arema Malang)
 Arif Suyono (Arema Malang)
 Udo Fortune (Arema Malang)
 Budi Sudarsono (Persik Kediri)
 Syamsul Chaerudin (PSM Makassar)
 Mario Costas (PSMS Medan)

3 goals

 Patricio Morales (Arema Malang)
 Abanda Herman (Persija Jakarta)
 Airlangga Sucipto (Persib Bandung)
 Eka Ramdani (Persib Bandung)
 Hamka Hamzah (Persik Kediri)
 Robert Gaspar (Persiba Balikpapan)
 Arnaldo Villalba (Persijap Jepara)
 Ebendje Rudolf (Persitara Jakarta Utara)
 Roberto Acosta (Deltras)
 Dede Hugo (Deltras)
 Wilfredo Genes (PKT Bontang)
 Titus Bonai (PKT Bontang)
 Bengondo Salomon (PSIS Semarang)
 Jules Basile Onambele (PSIS Semarang)
 Habel Satya (Persiwa Wamena)
 Lewis Weeks (Persiwa Wamena)
 O.K. John (Persiwa Wamena)
 Jimmy Suparno (Persela Lamongan)
 Ahmad Amirudin (PSM Makassar)
 Aun Carbiny (PSMS Medan)
 Andika Yudhistira Lubis (PSMS Medan)
 Esteban Guillen (PSMS Medan)

2 goals

 Roman Chmelo (Arema Malang)
 Buston Browne (Arema Malang)
 Ahmad Sembiring Usman (Arema Malang)
 Ian Kabes (Persipura Jayapura)
 Ortizan Solossa (Persipura Jayapura)
 Ricardo Salampessy (Persipura Jayapura)
 Nova Arianto (Persib Bandung)
 Carlos Bergotini (Deltras)
 Gustavo Chena (Deltras)
 Muhammad Kusen (Deltras)
 Zaenal Arif (Persib Bandung)
 Pepito Sanusie (Persiba Balikpapan)
 Ismed Sofyan (Persija Jakarta)
 Robertino Pugliara (Persija Jakarta)
 Cucu Hidayat (Persita Tangerang)
 Lubis Sukur (Persita Tangerang)
 George Nicolas Djone (Persita Tangerang)
 Christian Bekatal (Persita Tangerang)
 Immanuel Padwa(Persiwa Wamena)
 Vendry Mofu (Persiwa Wamena)
 Miftahul Huda (PKT Bontang)
 Tegao (PSMS Medan)
 Fabrício Bastos (PSMS Medan)
 Fery Ariawan (PSIS Semarang)
 Bienvenue Nnengue (PSIS Semarang)
 Diva Tarkas (PSM Makassar)
 Zainal Arifin (Persela Lamongan)
 Alexander Robinson (Liberian footballer) (Persela Lamongan)
 Mahyadi Panggabean (Persik Kediri)

1 goal

 Suroso (Arema Malang)
 Zulkifli Syukur (Arema Malang)
 Hendra Ridwan (Arema Malang)
 Rony Firmansyah (Arema Malang)
 Boy Jati Asmara (Deltras)
 Dwi Joko Prihatin (Deltras)
 Cornelis Kaimu (Deltras)
 Djalaludin Main (Pelita Jaya)
 Gendut Dony (Pelita Jaya)
 Carlos Eduardo (Pelita Jaya)
 Fabiano Beltrame (Persela Lamongan)
 Epalla Jordan (Persela Lamongan)
 Tommy Rifka Putra (Persela Lamongan)
 Agustiar Batubara (Persela Lamongan)
 Fabio Lopes (Persija Jakarta)
 Salim Alaydrus (Persib Bandung)
 Bruno Zandonadi (Persiba Balikpapan)
 Muhammadan (Persiba Balikpapan)
 Ade Suhendra (Persija Jakarta)
 Amarildo Souza (Persijap Jepara)
 Doni Fernando Siregar (Persijap Jepara)
 Ilham Hasan (Persijap Jepara)
 Victor Igbonefo (Persipura Jayapura)
 Edson Leonardo Hoces Pereira (PSIS Semarang)
 Denny Rumba (PSIS Semarang)
 Antônio Teles (PSIS Semarang)
 Abdelaziz Dnibi (PSIS Semarang)
 Muhammad Agus Salim (Persita Tangerang)
 Ervin Rianto (Persita Tangerang)
 Supriyadi (Persita Tangerang)
 Yulian Hontong (Persita Tangerang)
 Ade Mustari (Persita Tangerang)
 Dedi Mulyadi (Persitara Jakarta Utara)
 John Tarkpor (Persitara Jakarta Utara)
 Tutug Widodo (Persiwa Wamena)
 Yesaya Desnam (Persiwa Wamena)
 Albertho Mambrasar (Persiwa Wamena)
 Domertho Thesia (PKT Bontang)
 Irsyad Aras (PSM Makassar)
 Rahmat Latief (PSM Makassar)
 Asri Akbar (PSMS Medan)
 Henry Makinwa (PSMS Medan)
 Patricio Jiménez (PSMS Medan)
 Affan Lubis (PSMS Medan)
 Oktovianus Maniani (PSMS Medan)
 Mauro Jose de Oliveira Pinto (PSMS Medan)
 Juan Salaberry (PSMS Medan)
 Tony Sucipto (Sriwijaya)
 Wijay (Sriwijaya)
 Korinus Fringkeuw (Sriwijaya)

Own goals

 Miftahul Huda (PKT Bontang)
 Akhmad Taufik (Persiba Balikpapan)
 Sofyan Morhan (Persijap Jepara)

Hat-tricks

 4 : Player scored 4 goals

Clean sheets
Most clean sheets: 18 – Persiwa Wamena
Fewest clean sheets: 3 – PSMS Medan

References

Top level Indonesian football league seasons
Indonesia Super League seasons
Indonesia
1